Frederick Noel Perry (30 October 1933 – 11 July 2016) was an English footballer who played as a defender in the Football League for Liverpool. He also played non-league football for clubs including Worthing and Sittingbourne.

References

1933 births
2016 deaths
sportspeople from Cheltenham
Association football defenders
English footballers
Worthing F.C. players
Liverpool F.C. players
Sittingbourne F.C. players
English Football League players